Punnad is a village in Kannur district in the state of Kerala, India.

Location
Punnad is near Iritty and it is within Iritty Municipality and Iritty Taluk.

History 
Punnad was a part of Kingdom of Kottayam, Malabar Province.

Economy
There is a branch of State Bank of India at Punnad. Several traditional art forms are still practiced in the village, including those only found in the North Malabar area, such as Theyyam, Kalampaattu and Kolkkali.

The main mode of living for people the Punnad in the 2000s includes farming, Kooli thozhil (Coolie), Indian Army servants, teaching, various jobs in abroad(including Gulf countries).

Communal Clashes
There has been some communal violence over the years from 2005 till almost 2010, including political clashes and murders. Aswini Kumar's murder and Yakub's murder an after result of one of these clashes.

Religious Worship Places
Important temples in Punnad include Punnattappan Temple, Kuzhumbil Bhagavathi Kshethram, Kottathe Kunnu Vaireekhathakan Bhagavathi Temple, Chelappur Sree Subrahmanya Temple, Sree Muthappan Matappura-Punnad. There are many places practising Theyyam i.e., Thavilakutti Sree Sasthappan Kshethram, Parangad Pottan Thira, Pothiyadam Muchilott Bhagavathi Temple, Porakkalath Kavu, Kallangod Maramangalam, Thavilakuti Malayappura, Kiliyangad and Punnad Malayappura. Iritty Municipal office and the Keezhur village office are also situated in Punnad. We can see Muslim Juma Masjid nearby Punnad bus station and other two small Masjid, one in Meethale Punnad and one in Keezhu Kunnu.

Education
Most of the students study in L.P. and U.P. school in Punnad. There are CBSE and Kerala Higher education Schools nearby the village. There is a primary health centre at Eduppile Kunnu (a place in Punnad), it is 4KM away from Punnad -in Iritty or Mattannur. SBT, Cooperative Bank and Vanitha Banks are the main banking services available in this village. 

Meethale Punnad U.P. school, Punnad LP School and Niveditha Vidyalam are the schools in Punnad. Founder of Meethale Punnad U.P. school was Kannan Gurkal. He lighted the lamp of education in this village and his mission was continued by his sons (late) Raman Master and (late) Sreedharan master. The other followers and leaders of this endeavour are (late)K. Achuthan Master(HM, Punnad.L.P.School), Kesavan Master (manager, Punnad L.P.S), Balan master (HM, MPUPS), M.R. Raghavan (Peon, MPUPS), K.R. Karunakaran, Kelumaster etc.

Notable people 
Political leaders: Uppi Sahib

Freedom fighters: Appa Nair

Transportation
The national highway passes through Kannur town. Mangalore and Mumbai can be accessed on the northern side and Cochin and Thiruvananthapuram can be accessed on the southern side. The road to the east of Iritty connects to Mysore and Bangalore. The nearest railway stations are Kannur Railway Station and Thalassery Railway Station on Mangalore–Palakkad line. There are airports at Mangalore and Calicut.

References

Villages near Iritty